Păuleşti may refer to:

Păulești, Prahova, a commune in Prahova County, Romania
Păulești, Satu Mare, a commune in Satu Mare County, Romania
Păulești, Vrancea, a commune Vrancea County, Romania
Păuleşti, a village in Brusturi Commune, Bihor County, Romania
Păuleşti, a village in Bulzeștii de Sus Commune, Hunedoara County, Romania
Păuleşti, Călăraşi, a commune in Călăraşi district, Moldova

See also 
 Păuleni (disambiguation)
 Păuleasca (disambiguation)